Juan Bravo Lagunas, O.S.A. (died 20 November 1634), also Juan Bravo de Lagunas, was a Roman Catholic prelate who served as Bishop of Ugento (1616–1627).

Biography
Juan Bravo Lagunas was ordained a priest in the Order of Saint Augustine.
On 11 January 1616, he was appointed as Bishop of Ugento by Pope Paul V. On 17 January 1616, he was consecrated bishop by Pietro Aldobrandini, Archbishop of Ravenna with Orazio Mattei, Bishop of Gerace, and Angelo Rocca, Titular Bishop of Thagaste, as co-consecrators. He served as Bishop of Ugento until his resignation in 1627. He died on 20 November 1634.

Episcopal succession
While bishop, he served as the principal consecrator of:
Gregorio de Alarcón, Bishop of Santiago de Cuba (1624);
Bernardino de Almansa Carrión, Archbishop of Santo Domingo (1629); 
and the principal co-consecrator of:

See also
Catholic Church in Italy

References

External links and additional sources
 (for Chronology of Bishops) 
 (for Chronology of Bishops) 

1634 deaths
17th-century Italian Roman Catholic bishops
Bishops appointed by Pope Paul V
Augustinian bishops